The Business and Professionals Alliance for Hong Kong (BPA) is a pro-business pro-Beijing political party in Hong Kong. Chaired by Lo Wai-kwok, the party is currently the second-largest party in the Legislative Council of Hong Kong, holding eight seats. It also has two representatives in the Executive Council and five seats in the District Councils.

The Alliance came into existence on 7 October 2012 after the 2012 Legislative Council election, as a rebranding of a loose pro-business parliamentary group including Economic Synergy and Professional Forum, as well as two other nonpartisan legislators who mostly came from trade-based functional constituencies consisting of Hong Kong's leading chambers of commerce or business sectors. Out of the seven founding legislators, the party's only directly elected representative was Priscilla Leung of Kowloon West.

The party immediately emerged as the second-largest party in the legislature, overtaking the Liberal Party who had an uneasy relationship with Beijing as the representative for the big business interests. It also slowly expanded its grassroots by absorbing Priscilla Leung's Kowloon West New Dynamic and won 10 seats in the 2015 District Council election. The Alliance retained its seven seats in the 2016 Legislative Council election which saw its party chairman Andrew Leung elected as the Legislative Council President.

History

Founding
The Alliance was officially launched on 7 October 2012 on the basis of a loose political alliance under the same name on 21 August 2011, where 12 members of the Legislative Council from three pro-business groups, the Liberal Party, the Professional Forum, and the Economic Synergy joined together as a counter force to the pro-labour factions in the Legislative Council as well as the government. They fought over the Competition Bill subsequent to the Minimum Wage Bill with the support of powerful business unions and representative of small and medium-sized enterprises.

After the 2012 LegCo elections, members from the two members of the Professional Forum and three of the Economic Synergy with two other independent legislators officially formed the Alliance on 7 October 2012. Members were mostly supporters of Henry Tang, the former chief secretary who lost to Leung Chun-ying in the race in 2012 for the Chief Executive. The group consists of seven legislators which makes it the second largest political group in the Legislative Council, six of the seven members are from the functional constituencies. Unlike the grouping of the former legislature, the Liberal Party did not join the Alliance.

Development
During the 2015 Hong Kong electoral reform, Jeffrey Lam Kin-fung of the BPA and Ip Kwok-him of the Democratic Alliance for the Betterment and Progress of Hong Kong (DAB) led a walk-out of pro-Beijing legislators right before the historic vote on 18 June as an impromptu attempt to delay the division so that his party member Lau Wong-fat, who was delayed, could cast his vote in favour of the Beijing-backed reforms. The government's reform proposal failed as eight legislators voted in favour and 28 voted against, barely meeting the quorum of 35. Since it had been expected the reform would be voted down by 41-28 (which would fall only six votes short of the two-thirds absolute majority stipulated by the Basic Law), the failure in pro-Beijing camp's sudden tactics resulted in a surprising landslide defeat that gave the rest of the world the impression there was no support for the blueprint.

In the 2015 District Council election, the BPA won 10 seats in total. The alliance retained all seven seats in the 2016 Legislative Council election with the vice-chairman Jeffrey Lam narrowly defeated Liberal Party challenger Joseph Can Ho-lim in Commercial (First). After party chairman Andrew Leung was elected President of the Legislative Council, he resigned from as chairman post and was succeeded by Lo Wai-kwok. Leung was promoted as honorary chairman alongside Lau Wong-fat, while Lau's son, Kenneth Lau who took over his father seat in Heung Yee Kuk, was picked as the new vice-chairman.

In December 2018, legislator Ng Wing-ka of Industrial (Second) was invited to join the party, making the alliance the second largest party in the legislature with eight seats.

In February 2021, after Xia Baolong said that only "patriots" must govern Hong Kong, the BPA released a statement supporting Xia's position and that it looks forward to the changes. Additionally, the BPA claimed that Beijing is not trying to suppress antigovernmental voices.

Leadership

Chairmen
 Andrew Leung, 2012–2016
 Lo Wai-kwok, 2016–present

Vice-Chairmen
 Jeffrey Lam, 2012–present
 Christopher Cheung, 2012–present
 Priscilla Leung, 2012–present
 Kenneth Lau, 2016–present
 Ng Wing-ka, 2018–present

Secretaries-General
 Abraham Shek, 2012–present

Honorary Chairmen
 Lau Wong-fat, 2012–2017
 Andrew Leung, 2016–present

Council Chairmen
 Peter Lam, 2012–present

Council Vice-Chairmen
 David Lie, 2012–present

Performance in elections

Legislative Council elections

District Council elections

Representatives

Executive Council
 Jeffrey Lam
 Kenneth Lau

Legislative Council

District Councils
The BPA holds five seats in three District Councils (2020–2023):

See also
United Front Work Department
United Front (China)

References

External links
 Official website
 

Political parties in Hong Kong
Political parties established in 2012
2012 establishments in Hong Kong
Conservative parties in Hong Kong